West Virginia Route 42 is a north–south state highway connecting Grant County to Mineral County in West Virginia's Eastern Panhandle. The southern terminus of the route is at West Virginia Route 28 and West Virginia Route 55 in Petersburg. The northern terminus is at the Maryland state line in Blaine, where WV 42 becomes Maryland Route 38 upon crossing the North Branch of the Potomac River.

WV 42 runs concurrent with West Virginia Route 93 upon descending the Allegheny Front, and also with U.S. Route 50 between Mount Storm and Skyline, where WV 42 turns left towards Elk Garden.

Major intersections

References

042
Transportation in Mineral County, West Virginia
Transportation in Grant County, West Virginia